24 Frames Factory is an Indian film production company established by Vishnu Manchu , son of actor,Manchu Mohan Babu in 2007 and is subsidiary of Sree Lakshmi Prasanna Pictures.

Film production
Films that are produced under this banner are mostly with the actor Manchu Mohan Babu's family are;

Film distribution

T.V production

O intikatha
Intilo Ramaiah Veedilo Krish
Happy Days – First Session
Lakshmi Talk Show
Aam Aha Kma Kahaa
Happy Days – Second Session
Tirumala Mahatyam

Short Film Contest
Vishnu Manchu started a Short Film Contest launched by his premier production house 24 Frames Factory. The intention of this contest to bring out fresh talent and ideas. The award-winning entry will won a prize money of  100000 and give an opportunity to direct a film for 24 Frames Factory.

The jury members of this short film contest are Well-known Telugu filmmakers such as Ram Gopal Varma, Deva Katta, B.V.S.Ravi, Dasarath and writer duo Kona Venkat and Gopimohan. The duration of the competing short film should be three minutes.

The short film contest will be an annual affair, and the winners of the inaugural annual contest will be announced every year on actor-producer Mohan Babu's birthday 19 March.

References

External links
 24FramesFactory on Facebook
 24FramesFactory on Twitter
 24FramesFactory on YouTube

Film production companies based in Hyderabad, India
Mass media companies established in 2007
Film distributors of India
Indian companies established in 2007
2007 establishments in Andhra Pradesh